Capital City Airport  is a public airport in Fairview Township, York County, Pennsylvania, three miles (5 km) southeast of Harrisburg, the capital of Pennsylvania.

Most U.S. airports use the same three-letter location identifier for the FAA and IATA, but Capital City Airport is CXY to the FAA and HAR to the IATA (which assigned CXY to Cat Cays Airport, Bimini Islands, Bahamas.)

Overview
The airport is the home airport for the Pennsylvania Bureau of Aviation and the Pennsylvania State Police. It averages more than 57,000 corporate, charter, and private aircraft operations a year. Owned and operated by the Susquehanna Area Regional Airport Authority (SARAA), Capital City Airport is the designated reliever and sister airport of Harrisburg International Airport, and serves Dauphin, Cumberland, and York counties.

1954 airport diagram

A study by the PA Department of Transportation in 2000 concluded that Capital City Airport related activities generate nearly $24 million a year in economic output.

Facilities

In the year ending September 30, 2015 the airport had 27,348 aircraft operations, average 75 a day: 88% general aviation, 10% military, and 2% air taxi. 85 aircraft are based at the airport: 81% single-engine, 13% multi-engine, 3% helicopter and 2% jet.

History 
Originally Capital Landing Field, the airport opened in mid-1930 and was Harrisburg's first airline airport. On October 25, 1930, a Ford Trimotor airplane flying the first transcontinental air mail stopped at the airport. In 1934 the Commonwealth of Pennsylvania purchased it and renamed it Harrisburg-York State Airport. It was a stop on longer air routes, principally between Pittsburgh and Philadelphia. The airline was Transcontinental and Western Airlines which became TWA and remained until 1968. (DC-9s replaced TWA's last Constellations in 1967; the 4970-ft runway was one of the shortest in the country to see airline jets.) Allegheny and Capital/United appeared in the 1940s; United pulled out in 1966.

In the 1940s the airport handled war materials for the former adjacent New Cumberland Army Depot and hosted the Naval Photographic Reconnaissance Training School. The Army Air Corps stationed the 101st and 103d Observation Squadrons at Harrisburg early in the war to train pilots in observation and aerial photography. Later the Army Air Force formed the 6th Fighter Wing and 47th Bombardment Wing at the airport before their deployment overseas. New Cumberland Army depot remains although it has gone through several name changes over the years. It has been known as Defense Distribution Center (DDC) New Cumberland, Defense Distribution Region East (DDRE), and the Defense Distribution Supply Point (DDSP) Susquehanna. Currently it is known as the Defense Logistics Agency (DLA) Susquehanna, one of the largest military distribution centers for supplies and equipment for the U.S. Armed Forces

Olmsted Air Force Base, just across the river in Middletown was also close, and in 1968 Allegheny and TWA moved there to newly named Harrisburg International Airport. Capital City Airport then got its current name and became a general aviation airport.

Since 1999 Capital City Airport has been owned and operated by the Susquehanna Area Regional Airport Authority (SARAA). CXY is the designated reliever and sister airport of Harrisburg International Airport, and serves Dauphin, Cumberland, and York counties.

See also
 List of airports in Pennsylvania
 Pennsylvania World War II Army Airfields

References

External links 
Capital City Airport
Capital City Airport at Pennsylvania Bureau of Aviation

Volo Aviation Fixed-Base Operator

Airports in Pennsylvania
Airfields of the United States Army Air Forces in Pennsylvania
Transportation buildings and structures in York County, Pennsylvania